Vítor Manuel Lopes dos Santos (born 1 June 1958 in Chimoio, Mozambique) is a former Portuguese footballer who played midfielder at top level for Sporting Braga, and gained 1 cap for the Portugal national team.

External links 
 
 

1958 births
Living people
S.C. Braga players
Leixões S.C. players
Portugal international footballers
Portuguese footballers
Primeira Liga players
Association football midfielders